Andrian may refer to:
Andrian, South Tyrol, an Italian commune
Andrian (name)
 -andrian, a botanical suffix
SS Andrian, a British cargo ship
The Bacchanal of the Andrians, an oil painting by Titian

See also
Adrian
Andriano
Andriani
Andrien, a surname